The 1945 Taça de Portugal Final was the final match of the 1944–45 Taça de Portugal, the 7th season of the Taça de Portugal, the premier Portuguese football cup competition organized by the Portuguese Football Federation (FPF). The match was played on 1 July 1945 at the Campo das Salésias in Lisbon, and opposed two Primeira Liga sides: Olhanense and Sporting CP. Sporting CP defeated Olhanense 1–0 to claim their second Taça de Portugal.

Match

Details

References

1945
Taca
Sporting CP matches
S.C. Olhanense